Stefan Madsen (born 4 October 1976 in Maribo) is a Danish handball coach for Aalborg Håndbold.

See also
Sports in Denmark

References

1976 births
Living people
Danish handball coaches
People from Lolland Municipality
Sportspeople from Region Zealand
21st-century Danish people